The 2009 UIM F1 H2O World Championship was the 26th season of Formula 1 Powerboat racing. The calendar consisted of sixteen races, two per event, beginning in Portimão, Portugal on 4 April 2009, and ending in Sharjah, UAE on 11 December 2009. The format of two races per weekend was a new feature for 2009, introduced by series promoter Nicolo di San Germano at the official pre-season meeting in March. Guido Cappellini, driving for Zepter Team, was drivers' champion, securing an unprecedented tenth championship crown before retiring at the end of the year.

Teams and drivers

Season calendar

The most significant change for the 2009 season was the introduction of a two-race format for each event making up the championship. With eight rounds confirmed by the UIM prior to the season's start the season would be made up of a total of 16 points-scoring races, the highest in its history. Only the thirteen races in 2000 came close in the previous 10 years. Initial reaction to the new format was positive, with drivers and fans commending the decision following its debut at the Grand Prix of Portugal. However whilst it increased the spectacle and offered teams and drivers more opportunities for success, costs were forced upwards and the format wasn't retained for 2010.

The initial calendar for the 2009 season featured the Grand Prix of Russia in St Petersburg as the second round of the championship, taking place on 5 and 6 June. However the race was postponed, with an announcement made on 22 April that it would instead be moved to the second week of August, with the Grand Prix of Finland becoming the second round, on 12 and 13 June.

Results and standings
Points were awarded to the top 10 classified finishers. A maximum of two boats per team were eligible for points in the teams' championship.

Drivers standings

Teams standings
Only boats with results eligible for points counting towards the teams' championship are shown here.

References

External links
 The official website of the UIM F1 H2O World Championship
 The official website of the Union Internationale Motonautique

F1 Powerboat World Championship
Formula 1 Powerboat seasons
F1 Powerboat World Championship